Emil Sylvegård (born 2 March 1993) is a Swedish professional ice hockey forward for Malmö Redhawks of the Swedish Hockey League (SHL).

Sylvegård made his SHL debut playing with Luleå HF during the 2014–15 SHL season.

References

External links 
 

1993 births
Asplöven HC players
Drummondville Voltigeurs players
Swedish expatriate ice hockey players in Canada
IK Oskarshamn players
Linköping HC players
Living people
Luleå HF players
Malmö Redhawks players
Regina Pats players
Swedish ice hockey forwards
Sportspeople from Malmö